Street Fighter II: The Animated Movie, known as  in Japan and Australia, is a 1994 anime film adaptation of the Street Fighter II fighting game written by Kenichi Imai, directed by Gisaburō Sugii and animated by Group TAC. The film, originally released in Japan on August 6, 1994, was released theatrically in the United Kingdom, France, and Spain, and was adapted into English in dubbed and subtitled format by Animaze for Manga Entertainment. It was distributed by Toei Company in Japan, while 20th Century Fox also distributed in other countries.

The film was a critical and commercial success. Group TAC later produced another loose adaptation of the Street Fighter II game, the anime series Street Fighter II V. Though unrelated to the film, a handful of Animaze voice actors reprised their roles for their English dub of the series, produced after ADV Films's dub.

A live-action film, Street Fighter, was released on December 23, 1994, in the United States and May 6, 1995, in Japan by Universal Pictures and Columbia Pictures.

Plot
In the prologue, a fight between Japanese martial artist Ryu and Muay Thai champion Sagat rages until Ryu severely scars Sagat across the chest with a Shoryuken, a rising uppercut attack that is empowered by ki spiritual energy. Enraged, Sagat charges at Ryu. However Ryu claims victory by launching his Hadouken, a technique where he charges his ki power into his hands and is fired off in the form of a powerful energy blast. Sagat vows revenge.

A couple of years later, following the assassination of a Justice Minister by Cammy White, a hypnotized MI6 Agent, Interpol agent Chun-Li suggests that they join forces with the United States Military to destroy the enigmatic crime syndicate known as Shadowlaw. Captain Guile, who is out for revenge against Shadowlaw's leader, M. Bison, for the death of his best friend, initially refuses, but eventually relents when Chun-Li later tells him that Bison killed her father years ago and she herself wants revenge, but knows that her duty comes first. At the Shadowlaw base, Bison, along with his bodyguards Balrog, Vega, and Sagat, orders a worldwide manhunt for Ryu, determined to induct him into his organization, and sends out hundreds of monitor cyborgs to find more valuable martial artists for their cause. However, Ryu, who is traveling the world to seek out worthy challengers, such as Fei-Long, Dhalsim, and E. Honda, remains undetected due to suppressing his Ki.

Meanwhile, Ryu's American best friend and fighting rival, Ken Masters, has settled down with his girlfriend, Eliza, but still yearns for a good challenge and desires a rematch with Ryu. During a tussle with T. Hawk, who had sought out Ken to challenge him, Ken is seen by a monitor cyborg and the footage of the fight is sent to the Shadowlaw base. Bison sees the footage and learns of Ken's history with Ryu, and decides to hunt him down and hypnotize him in Ryu's stead. Along the way, Bison sees Chun-Li and Guile warning Dee Jay about the monitor cyborgs and destroying one in the process, and subsequently sends Vega to New York to kill Chun-Li. Vega ambushes Chun-Li in her apartment, but after a bloody fight, Chun-Li kicks Vega through the wall of the building and he falls to his death, yet she is badly wounded and falls into a coma. Guile arrives and rushes her to the hospital. He also learns of Ryu and Ken from Interpol, and after learning that Bison has captured Ken, Guile rushes to Thailand to warn Ryu, who is training in the mountains with E. Honda.

Bison, however, follows Guile and confronts them. He sets the hypnotized Ken on Ryu, who initially refuses to fight back. Honda battles Balrog while Guile faces Bison and is severely beaten, though Bison spares his life as a final insult. As Ryu prepares to retaliate against Ken, memories of their past wreak havoc on Ken's mind and he manages to break free of Bison's mind control. The enraged Bison unleashes his Psycho Power upon Ken and casts him afar before turning his attention to Ryu, who fights Bison with very little success. Ken uses his master's Ki teachings to mend his body and joins the fight. With their combined forces, Ryu and Ken eventually pummel Bison into submission and hurl a joint Hadouken at him, apparently destroying him. Honda defeats Balrog and rescues both Guile and Balrog. Shortly afterwards, the United States Military locate and destroy the entrance to Bison's base, presumably arresting all of Bison's subordinates and bringing Shadowlaw down.

Chun-Li makes a full recovery and reunites with Guile in the hospital, informing him that their mission was a success. Elsewhere, Ryu and Ken part ways once again and Ryu begins his journey anew. However, he is ambushed from behind by a huge truck, with the driver revealed to be Bison, who survived the battle. The film closes as Ryu leaps towards the truck to fight Bison again.

A post-credits message promotes a Japan Spring 1995 release for the Street Fighter live-action film, starring Jean-Claude Van Damme and the late legendary Raul Julia.

Voice cast
Main

Secondary

Production
The movie was formally announced by Capcom Japan at a Street Fighter II Turbo tournament held at the Ryōgoku Kokugikan on August 19, 1993. Capcom produced the film on a budget of $6million. The fight sequences of the film were choreographed by K-1 founder Kazuyoshi Ishii and professional fighter Andy Hug.

Initially, Masashi Ikeda was announced as the director, but due to various circumstances, he was dropped out and replaced by Gisaburo Sugii.

English versions

1995 home video version
Two English dubbed versions were released directly to VHS and LaserDisc in 1995 by SMV Enterprises in North America: a tamer PG-13 version, and an unrated cut which contains, among other things, a slightly more revealing shower scene featuring Chun-Li that is still censored from the original Japanese version. The movie was released in the United Kingdom by Manga Entertainment UK under license from Capcom. Manga's UK release is censored in a similar way to the US version, yet profanity is retained and is rated 15 by the BBFC. Manga's Australian release is entirely uncut and is rated M by the ACB. In addition, a slightly different version of the movie appears in both the PlayStation 2 and Xbox versions of the Street Fighter Anniversary Collection as a bonus feature accessible from Hyper Street Fighter IIs Gallery Mode. It is more censored than the PG-13 version in terms of language, and contains some other minor edits not related to mature or vulgar content. The American VHS releases and the version in the North American Street Fighter Anniversary Collection were pan and scan while the Region 1 DVD has non-anamorphic widescreen. The European VHS version is non-anamorphic widescreen. These localized English versions replaced the original Japanese soundtrack in favor of licensed, popular alternative, Western soundtracks from KMFDM, Korn, Alice in Chains, Silverchair, and other bands, as well an instrumental score.

2006 DVD version
An Uncut, Uncensored, Unleashed DVD version of the movie was released in North America on July 18, 2006, and addresses the complaints made about the censored English versions of the film in 1995. Unlike the previous unrated version released in the US, which was still censored, this release is uncut from the original Japanese version and, for the first time (for non-Japanese releases of the movie), contains the original Japanese soundtrack in addition to the English soundtrack (both featuring a new Dolby Digital 5.1 mix). It is a double-sided DVD, with one side containing the English dub with the English soundtrack and the other side containing the original Japanese voices with the original Japanese soundtrack with optional English subtitles.

The video on the English and Japanese sides differ, though, with the Japanese side having a new, higher quality transfer from the original Japanese master. Like the original Japanese release and the UK release, the movie is presented in 1.85:1 non-anamorphic widescreen. The addition of Chun-Li's shower scene and a longer credit roll also makes the Japanese cut of the film longer by three minutes. The dubbed US and UK versions are still slightly cut. The English dubbed version has two instances of the word "fuck" in it.

Prior to the 2016 Discotek release, the Australian release by Manga & Madman Entertainment was the only version of the movie to date on either DVD or Blu-ray that is completely uncut outside Japan. At the time, Madman were not satisfied with the quality of any of the video masters available and instead created their own, using a transfer sourced from the original Japanese LaserDisc and applying both IVTC and DNR. The English dub on the disc is the original dub recorded by Manga Entertainment and Animaze, free from any editing of profanity and both English and Japanese dubs have been remixed into 5.1 audio. Easter eggs on the DVD contain three Japanese trailers for the movie as well as making available a version of the movie with the Japanese credits. The aspect ratio of the Australian release is an anamorphic 1.77:1.

Netflix
As part of their 2008 deal with Starz Entertainment, Netflix made the film available for streaming. As of 2022, it is no longer available.

Street Fighter Anniversary Collector's box
A Blu-ray release was included with the Street Fighter Anniversary Collector's box set, which was released on September 18, 2012. However, the movie is presented in standard definition and contains no nudity.

2013 Kaze release
The film was released with a fresh 16:9 1080p transfer on Blu-ray and as a DVD/Blu combo set in 2013 by Kaze in France with the standalone Blu-ray being distributed in the United Kingdom by Manga UK. The release uses stereo audio tracks of the original Japanese track, a French one, and a heavily censored English dub based on the PG-13 cut. (thus lacking the 5.1 mixes included with the 2006 release) but features the full uncut video including the Chun-Li shower scene intact. It has optional English and French subtitles and the aspect ratio is 1.85:1.

2016 Discotek release
In October 2016, Discotek Media released a new 16:9 1080p transfer on Blu-ray with fully uncut footage and various English and Japanese audio tracks, including the rare unrated English dub mixed with the Japanese soundtrack. It has optional newly translated English subtitles and the aspect ratio is 1.85:1. An anamorphic DVD with similar features was also released by Discotek.

Soundtrack

Japanese version
For the Japanese release, two soundtrack albums were released by Sony Records in 1994.

Street Fighter II Movie Original Soundtrack

Street Fighter II Movie Original Soundtrack features musical score tracks by Yuji Toriyama and songs by Ryōko Shinohara, Big Life, and Alph Lyla.

All tracks are written and performed by Yuji Toriyama, except where indicated.

Street Fighter II Movie Soundtrack Vol. 2: Original Score Album

Street Fighter II Movie Soundtrack Vol. 2: Original Score Album features additional musical score tracks by Yuji Toriyama and a Q Sound remix of "Itoshisa to Setsunasa to Kokoro Zuyosa to", which was used during the Dramatic Battle fight with Ryu and Ken against M. Bison in the Japanese arcade version of Street Fighter Alpha.

All tracks are written and performed by Yuji Toriyama, except where indicated.

English version
The alternative/grunge-oriented musical score for the English version was composed by Cory Lerios and John D'Andrea. Songs featured in the movie include:

 Korn – "Blind"
 Alice in Chains – "Them Bones"
 Silverchair – "Israel's Son"
 In the Nursery – "Hallucinations" (Dream World Mix)
 Black/Note – "Evil Dancer"
 KMFDM – "Ultra"
 Smokin' Suckaz wit Logic – "Cuz I'm Like Dat"
 Intermix – "Mantra"

Reception
At the Japanese box office, the film grossed more than $16million, becoming one of 1994's top five highest-grossing films in Japan.

In the United States, the home video release sold close to 500,000 copies of two versions, Unrated and PG-13. One of these versions sold 200,000 copies in the United States.

Related media

Video game

Capcom produced a video game adaptation of the film simply titled Street Fighter II MOVIE. The game was released exclusively in Japan for the PlayStation on December 15, 1995, and the Sega Saturn on March 15, 1996. Despite the similar title, it is unrelated to the arcade game Street Fighter: The Movie, nor with the home console game of the same name, both based on the live-action film. Although unreleased in America, the game was shown at the 1995 Electronic Entertainment Expo under the title of Street Fighter II: The Interactive Movie. A version for the 3DO Interactive Multiplayer was also announced, but never released. The game consists of footage from the movie mixed with newly animated footage by Group TAC created specifically for the game (including an opening video).

The player takes control of a new type of monitor cyborg that has been secretly developed by Shadaloo. The objective of the game is to develop the Cyborg's abilities by analyzing the fighting techniques of martial artists around the world in order to gain enough strength to challenge Ryu in combat. The gameplay consists of watching pre-rendered footage and analyzing them using the "search" command. For example, if the scene is shown which involves a character performing a kick technique, then the cyborg's kick abilities will increase by pointing and clicking on the character's kicks. On each stage, the player has a limited amount of time to analyze their surrounding as much as possible in order to gather the most data.

While the majority of the game is strictly a life simulation, the final battle between the Cyborg and Ryu is a one-on-one fighting segment that features the same game system as  Super Street Fighter II Turbo (including the presence of the Super Combo gauge). All of the Cyborg's acquired abilities can be put to use in battle. The Cyborg's special moves are the same ones used by Ken in Super Street Fighter II Turbo, including his Shōryū Reppa Super Combo.

The player can keep track of their Cyborg's development via a save file or through a passcode and test their Cyborg's current abilities against a virtual hologram of Ryu. This practice segments can also be played with a second player. The game also includes a database featuring information on the characters from the film.

Manga
A manga adaptation of the film was authored by Takayuki Sakai and serialized in the monthly CoroCoro Comic in 1994, later republished in a single tankōbon collected edition. An English adaptation of this manga was published by Viz Communications as a six-issue comic book, released monthly from August 1995 to February 1996.

Legacy
The movie served as the basis for Street Fighter Alpha. Many elements and character designs were integrated into future games of the series (the Street Fighter Alpha series in particular). The film's final battle is loosely adapted into Ryu's story in Street Fighter Alpha 3, where Ryu's sub-boss is a brainwashed Ken, whom he must defeat before facing Bison.

The film's success also led to the production of a television series, Street Fighter II V, and another animated film, Street Fighter Alpha: The Animation. While neither are set in the same continuity as the film, the Animaze English dubs featured a handful of actors reprising their roles from the film.

Though it was preceded by Fatal Fury: The Motion Picture by one month, both movies' positive receptions also led to the production of several anime adaptations of different fighting video game series, such as Tekken: The Motion Picture, Battle Arena Toshinden, Night Warriors: Darkstalkers' Revenge, and Samurai Shodown: The Motion Picture, though none reached the same critical success.

See also 

Street Fighter Alpha: The Animation
Street Fighter Alpha: Generations

Notes

References

External links
 
 
 
 

1994 anime films
1990s children's fantasy films
1990s Japanese-language films
Anime films based on video games
Discotek Media
Films about terrorism in Asia
Films directed by Gisaburō Sugii
Films set in China
Films set in India
Films set in the Las Vegas Valley
Films set in London
Films set in Los Angeles
Films set in Seattle
Films set in Thailand
Group TAC
Japanese films set in New York City
Japanese martial arts films
Manga Entertainment
Street Fighter anime and manga
Street Fighter films
Foreign films set in the United States